Wendy Jean King is an English international bowls player.

Bowls career
Wendy King won a silver medal at the 2008 World Outdoor Bowls Championship pairs and competed in the 2012 World Outdoor Bowls Championship and 2016 World Outdoor Bowls Championship.

The bowler who represents Kent has won three National titles; in 2001 she won the National Triples followed by the 2006 and 2009 Two Wood Singles Championship.

In 2013, she won three medals at the European Bowls Championships in Spain and in 2015, she won the pairs and fours bronze medals at the Atlantic Bowls Championships.

In 2016, she was part of the fours team with Rebecca Wigfield, Jamie-Lea Winch and Ellen Falkner who won the silver medal at the 2016 World Outdoor Bowls Championship in Christchurch.

References

English female bowls players
Living people
1962 births
Bowls European Champions